Scutopus is a genus of chaetoderm mollusc once assigned to the family Scutopodidae. Species in this genus include:

 Scutopus chilensis
 Scutopus megaradulatus
 Scutopus robustus
 Scutopus ventrolineatus

References

External links

Aplacophorans